Silent Hunter may refer to:

 Silent Hunter (video game)
 Silent Hunter (laser weapon)